Rountzenheim-Auenheim is a commune in the Bas-Rhin department in Grand Est in north-eastern France. It was established on 1 January 2019 by merger of the former communes of Rountzenheim (the seat) and Auenheim.

See also
 Communes of the Bas-Rhin department

References

Communes of Bas-Rhin
States and territories established in 2019
Populated places established in 2019